Madreblu is a rock band from Lodi, Italy, with a trip hop sound similar to that of Deep Forest or a faster and more upbeat Portishead.

Madreblu was formed in 1995 and consisted of Raffaella Destefano (vocals), Gino Marcelli (piano and keyboards), and Valerio Artusi (keyboards). The band released Prima dell’ Alba in 1997, but Artusi left the band in 1998. Destefano and Marcelli released Necessità in 1999. The duo released L' Equilibrio in 2004. Raffaella Destefano left the Band in 2008 to pursue a career of her own.

The song "Certamente" from Necessità is featured on the album The Sopranos: Peppers and Eggs. The song is briefly heard in the Sopranos episode "Commendatori" (season 2, episode 4), during the second scene in which Christopher is seen to be high from having taken heroin.

Discography

Albums
Prima dell'alba (1997)
Necessità (1999)
L'equilibrio (2004)

External links
 Official website
 Old website

Italian electronic music groups
Trip hop groups